Aqa may refer to:
Aqa, Kermanshah
Aqa, Lorestan